Philipp W. Rosemann (born February 24, 1964, in Frankfurt) is a German philosopher and Cottrill-Rolfes Chair at University of Kentucky. Previously he was Professor of Philosophy at Maynooth University. He is the co-editor of Dallas Medieval Texts and Translations. 
Prior to his tenure at Maynooth, he taught at the University of Dallas for twenty years.

He is a member of the Royal Irish Academy and of the ecumenical Beatrice Institute of Pittsburgh.

Books
 Charred Root of Meaning: Continuity, Transgression, and the Other in Christian Tradition (Grand Rapids, Michigan: Eerdmans, 2018).
 The Story of a Great Medieval Book: Peter Lombard's "Sentences" (Toronto: Toronto University Press, 2007).
 Peter Lombard (New York: Oxford University Press, 2004), 
 Understanding Scholastic Thought with Foucault (New York/London: St Martin's Press/Macmillan, 1999).
 Omne ens est aliquid. Introduction à la lecture du "système" philosophique de saint Thomas d'Aquin (Louvain: Peeters, 1996).
 Omne agens agit sibi simile: A "Repetition" of Scholastic Metaphysics (Louvain: Leuven University Press, 1996).

References

External links
 

German philosophers
Philosophy academics
Academics of Maynooth University
University of Dallas faculty
1964 births
Living people
German Freemasons